Sokhna Lacoste née Diop (born 25 August 2000) is a French track and field sprinter. She represented France at the 2020 Summer Olympics in Tokyo 2021, competing in women's 4 × 400 metres relay.

References

External links
 

2000 births
Living people
French female sprinters
Athletes (track and field) at the 2020 Summer Olympics
Olympic athletes of France
People from Kaolack
21st-century French women